Southend Rugby Club (also known as Southend Saxons) is an English rugby union football club based in Southend-on-Sea, Essex. The club currently plays in the sixth tier of English club rugby, participating in London 1 North following their relegation from London & South East Premier at the end of the 2017-18 season. The club runs six senior sides, including a women's team (the Saints) and a full range of age grade teams.

History
Southend RFC was formed in 1870 and was originally called Southend Foot Ball Club. The club moved to its current location in 1978 and this heralded a golden period for the club, including three county cup victories in the decade before club rugby was introduced. The club was placed in Area 4 South but relegations saw the club relegated to London North East 3 by the turn of the millennium. However, a major turnaround saw the club back in the national leagues by 2003 and the club has remained at that level ever since, having returned to the level in which the club when the leagues were founded in 1987. In 2014, the first team name was changed to Southend Saxons.

Honours
 London Division 3 North East champions: 2000–01
 London 2 (north v south) promotion playoff winners: 2001–02
 London Division 1 champions: 2002–03
 National League Division 3 South champions: 2006–07
 Essex Senior Cup winners: 2003–04

See also
 Essex RFU

 English rugby union system

References

External links
 Official website

English rugby union teams
Rugby clubs established in 1870
Rugby union clubs in Essex
Sports clubs in Southend-on-Sea